is a UCI Continental cycling team based in Japan. It was founded in 2006. For the 2014 season, the team added several riders from Spain, including Eduard Prades for the last part of the season. Masahiro Yasuhara is currently the manager of the team.

Team roster

Major wins

2007
Stage 2 Tour of Thailand, Masahiko Mifune
2011
Stage 2 Tour de Hokkaido, Takahiro Yamashita
2012
Stage 2 Tour of Małopolska, Mariusz Wiesiak
2014
Stage 5 Tour of Thailand, Sebastián Mora
2015
Stage 2 Tour de Ijen, Benjamín Prades
Stage 4 Tour of Japan, Benjamín Prades
Overall Tour de Kumano, Benjamín Prades
Stage 2, Benjamín Prades
2017
Overall Tour de Kumano, José Vicente Toribio
Young rider classification, Kenji Takubo
Tour de Okinawa, Junya Sano
2018
Stage 3 Tour de Kumano, Junya Sano
2019
Points classification Vuelta al Táchira, Orluis Aular
Stage 3, Orluis Aular
Overall Ronda Pilipinas, Francisco Mancebo
Stage 1, Francisco Mancebo
Overall Tour de Kumano, Orluis Aular
Points classification, Orluis Aular
Stage 1, Orluis Aular
2021 
Stage 2 Tour of Japan, José Vicente Toribio
Oita Urban Classic, Francisco Mancebo
2022
Tour of Japan
Points classification, Leonel Quintero
Mountains classification, Marino Kobayashi
Stage 2 Tour de Kumano, Leonel Quintero

References

External links

UCI Continental Teams (Asia)
Cycling teams established in 2006
Cycling teams based in Japan
2006 establishments in Japan